The German Olympic Sports Confederation ( or DOSB) was founded on 20 May 2006 by a merger of the Deutscher Sportbund (DSB), and the Nationales Olympisches Komitee für Deutschland (NOK) which dates back to 1895, the year it was founded and recognized as NOC by the IOC.

Seated in Frankfurt am Main, it represents 89,000 clubs and 27,000,000 members, about a third of the population of Germany.

Presidential Board 

DOSB-President is Alfons Hörmann. Also members of the presidential board are:
Stephan Abel (Vice President, economy and finances)
Ole Bischof (Vice President, competitive sports)
Walter Schneeloch (Vice President, popular sports and development of sports)
Gudrun Doll-Tepper (Vice President, education and olympic breeding)
Petra Tzschoppe (Vice President, women and equality)
Ingo-Rolf Weiss (chairman of Deutsche Sportjugend)
Christian Schreiber (representative of the athletes)
Claudia Bokel (German IOC Member)
Thomas Bach (IOC President)

Executive Board 

Michael Vesper (CEO)
Thomas Arnold
Dirk Schimmelpfennig
Martin Schönwandt
Karin Fehres

History and structure 

As one of the first nations, Germany founded a NOC in 1895, purposefully named "Komitee für die Beteiligung Deutschlands an den Olympischen Spielen zu Athen" ("Committee for the participation of Germany at the Olympic Games in Athens"). It was recognized by the IOC, and Germany took part in 1896 for the first time. The name of the temporary NOC changed to reflect the next two host towns, before it became permanent after 1904.

The 1916 Summer Olympics had been awarded to Berlin, but were canceled because of the duration of World War I, with Germany and other Central Powers getting excluded from the "Olympic family" which was dominated by the Entente Powers. Thus, in 1917, the "Deutscher Reichsausschuss für Olympische Spiele" (DRA, DRAfOS "German Imperial Commission for Olympic Games") was renamed Deutscher Reichsausschuss für Leibesübungen (DRL, "German Imperial Commission for Physical Exercise")  to reflect and protest the non-Olympic situation.

In lieu of the Olympic Games of 1920, for which Germany and its allies were not invited, "Deutsche Kampfspiele" ("German Sports Contests")  were organized, both for Summer and Winter, with the 1922 Winter edition predating the first Olympic Winter Games by two years. Hardly surprising, Berlin, having been prepared for 1916, was the site for the first Summer event:
 1922 
Garmisch und Partenkirchen (Oberbayern)
 18 – ?? June 1922 Berlin
 1926 
Triberg und Titisee (Schwarzwald)
 4 – 11 July 1926 Köln
 1930 
Krummhübel (Riesengebirge)
 26 – 29 June 1930 Breslau

Unlike others, Germany was still not invited for 1924. In 1925, the DRL split up, to remain focused on sports in Germany, while the NOC section became the Deutscher Olympischer Ausschuss (DOA, "German Olympic Commission") in order to focus on international relations and the promotion of the return of Germany to Olympics. This succeeded for 1928, with Germany taking part in both games.

The organisations remained separate, even though Nazi Germany took influence from 1933 onwards. In 1931, the IOC had decided to give both 1936 Olympic Games to Germany.

After the war, Germany was occupied and partitioned. In 1946, the DOA was dissolved. Soon, in June 1947, Adolf Friedrich zu Mecklenburg founded a new provisional Deutscher Olympischer Ausschuss, which was not recognized by IOC as it did not represent any recognized state yet. On 23 May 1949, the Federal Republic of Germany was established on the territory of the Western occupied zones. On 24 September 1949 the Nationales Olympisches Komitee für Deutschland ("National Olympic Committee for Germany") was founded in Bonn as successor to the DOA.

In October 1949, under Soviet occupation, the German Democratic Republic was founded, which on 22 April 1951 founded a separate Nationales Olympisches Komitee für Ostdeutschland ("National Olympic Committee for East Germany"), in 1965 renamed to "Nationales Olympisches Komitee der DDR" ("National Olympic Committee of the GDR"). Only in 1968 it was recognized by IOC as fully independent member.

As a third German state, under French occupation, was the Saar (protectorate) (1947–1956), which also founded sporting organisations in order to take part in international competition, like football and the Olympics. The Nationales Olympisches Komitee des Saarlandes ("") was founded in 1950 and recognized by the IOC.

After criticism due to lack of success in 2004, the Deutscher Sportbund ("German ") (DSB) and the Nationales Olympisches Komitee für Deutschland (NOK) decided to merge in 2005.

Member organisations

16 State-level member organisations 

 Sports Confederation of Bavaria (Bayerischer Landes-Sportverband)
 Sports Confederation of Hamburg (Hamburger Sportbund)
 Sports Confederation of Baden-Württemberg (Landessportverband Baden-Württemberg)
 Sports Confederation of Berlin (Landessportbund Berlin)
 Sports Confederation of Brandenburg (Landessportbund Brandenburg)
 Sports Confederation of Bremen (Landessportbund Bremen)
 Sports Confederation of Saarland (Landessportverband für das Saarland)
 Sports Confederation of Hesse (Landessportbund Hessen)
 Sports Confederation of Mecklenburg-West Pomerania (Landessportbund Mecklenburg-Vorpommern)
 Sports Confederation of Lower Saxony (Landessportbund Niedersachsen)
 Sports Confederation of North Rhine-Westphalia (Landessportbund Nordrhein-Westfalen)
 Sports Confederation of Rhineland-Palatinate (Landessportbund Rheinland-Pfalz)
 Sports Confederation of Saxony (Landessportbund Sachsen)
 Sports Confederation of Saxony-Anhalt (Landessportbund Sachsen-Anhalt)
 Sports Confederation of Schleswig-Holstein (Landessportverband Schleswig-Holstein)
 Sports Confederation of Thuringia (Landessportbund Thüringen)

62 member organisations 

34 Olympic Sport Federations
 German Bobsleigh, Luge, and Skeleton Federation (Bob-und Schlittenverband für Deutschland, BSD)
 German Judo Federation (Deutscher Judo-Bund, DJB)
 German Cycling Federation (Bund Deutscher Radfahrer, BDR)
  (Deutscher Kanu-Verband, DKV)
  (Bundesverband Deutscher Gewichtheber, BVDG)
 German Athletics Association (Deutscher Leichtathletik-Verband, DLV)
 German Ice Skating Union (Deutsche Eislauf-Union, DEU)
  (Deutscher Ringer-Bund, DRB)
  (Deutsche Eisschnelllauf-Gemeinschaft, DESG)
  (Deutscher Ruderverband, DRV)
 German Equestrian Federation (Deutsche Reiterliche Vereinigung)
 German Rugby Federation (Deutscher Rugby-Verband, DRV)
 German Taekwondo Union (Deutsche Taekwondo Union, DTU)
 German Shooting and Archery Federation (Deutscher Schützenbund, DSB)
  (Deutsche Triathlon Union, DTU)
 German Swimming Federation (Deutscher Schwimm-Verband, DSV)
 German Badminton Association (Deutscher Badminton-Verband, DBV)
 German Sailing Federation (Deutscher Segler-Verband, DSV)
 German Basketball Federation (Deutscher Basketball Bund, DBB)
 German Ski Association (Deutscher Skiverband, DSV)
  (Deutscher Boxsport-Verband, DBV)
 German Tennis Federation (Deutscher Tennis Bund, DTB)
 German Curling Association (Deutscher Curling Verband, DCV)
  (Deutscher Tischtennis-Bund, DTTB)
 German Ice Hockey Federation (Deutscher Eishockey-Bund, DEB)
  (Deutscher Turner-Bund, DTB)
  (Deutscher Fechter-Bund, DFB)
  (Deutscher Verband für Modernen Fünfkampf, DVMF)
 German Football Association (Deutscher Fußball-Bund, DFB)
  (Deutscher Volleyball-Verband, DVV)
  (Deutscher Golf Verband, DGV)
  (Snowboard Verband Deutschland, SVD)
 German Handball Association (Deutscher Handballbund, DHB)
 German Hockey Federation (Deutscher Hockey-Bund, DHB)

28 Non-Olympic Sport Federations
 American Football Association of Germany (American Football Verband Deutschland)
 German Mini Golf Sport Association (Deutscher Minigolfsport Verband, DMV)
 German Federation of Powerlifters (Bundesverband Deutscher Kraftdreikämpfer, BVDK)
 German Motor Sport Federation (Deutscher Motor Sport Bund, DMSB)
 German Billiard Union (Deutsche Billard-Union, DBU)
 German Motorboat Association (Deutscher Motoryachtverband, DMYV)
 German Life Saving Association (Deutsche Lebens-Rettungs-Gesellschaft, DLRG)
 German Heavy Athletics and Tug of War Federation (Deutscher Rasenkraftsport- und Tauzieh-Verband, DRTV)
 German Aero Club (Deutscher Aero Club, DAeC)
 German Roller and Inline-Skating Sport Federation (Deutscher Rollsport-und Inline Verband, DRIV)
 German Alpine Club (Deutscher Alpenverein, DAV)
 German Chess Federation (Deutscher Schachbund, DSB)
 German Baseball and Softball Federation (Deutscher Baseball und Softball Verband, DBV)
 German Skibob Federation (Deutscher Skibob Verband, DSBV)
 National Paralympic Committee Germany (Deutscher Behindertensportverband, DBS)
 German Acrobatic Gymnastics Federation (Deutscher Sportakrobatik-Bund. DSAB)
 German Boccia, Boules and Pétanque Association (Deutscher Boccia-, Boule- und Pétanque-Verband, DBBPV)
 German Squash Association (Deutscher Squash Verband, DSQV)
 German Darts Federation (Deutscher Dart-Verband, DDV)
 German Dance Sport Federation (Deutscher Tanzsportverband, DTV)
 German Ice Stock Sport Association (Deutscher Eisstock-Verband, DESV)
 German Waterski and Wakeboard Federation (Deutscher Wasserski- und Wakeboardverband, DWWV)
 German Deaf Sports Federation (Deutscher Gehörlosen-Sportverband, DGS)
 German Floorball Federation (Floorball-Verband Deutschland)
 German Ju-Jitsu Federation (Deutscher Ju-Jutsu Verband, DJJV)
 German Underwater Federation (Verband Deutscher Sporttaucher, VDST)
 German Karate Federation (Deutscher Karate Verband, DKV)
 German Nine- and Ten-pin Bowling Association (Deutscher Kegler- und Bowlingbund, DKB)

20 specials member organisations 

 Allgemeiner Deutscher Hochschulsportverband		
 Deutsches Polizeisportkuratorium
 Bundesverband staatl. anerk. Berufsfachschulen für Gymnastik und Sport		
 DJK-Sportverband
 CVJM-Sport		
 Gewerkschaft Erziehung und Wissenschaft—Sportkommission
 Deutsche Gesellschaft für Sportmedizin und Prävention (Deutscher Sportärztebund) e. V.		
 Kneipp-Bund e.V.
 Deutsche Olympische Gesellschaft		
 Makkabi Deutschland
 Deutsche Vereinigung für Sportwissenschaft		
 Rad-und Kraftfahrerbund (RKB) "Solidarität" Deutschland 1896
 Deutscher Aikido-Bund		
 Special Olympics Deutschland e.V.
 Deutscher Betriebssportverband		
 Stiftung Sicherheit im Skisport
 Deutscher Sportlehrerverband		
 Verband Deutscher Eisenbahner-Sportvereine e. V. (VDES)
 Deutscher Verband für das Skilehrwesen—Interski Deutschland		
 Deutscher Verband für Freikörperkultur e.V.

See also
Germany at the Olympics
National Paralympic Committee Germany
National Socialist League of the Reich for Physical Exercise

References

External links 
 German Olympic Sports Confederation
 IG NOV (for non-Olympic sports)
 Team Deutschland

National Olympic Committees
Germany at the Olympics
Olympic
1895 establishments in Germany
Sports organizations established in 1895
Sport in Frankfurt